Ahoy! was a computer magazine published between January 1984 and January 1989 in the US, focusing on all Commodore color computers, but especially the Commodore 64 and Amiga.

History
The first issue of Ahoy! was published in January 1984. The magazine was published monthly by Ion International and was headquartered in New York City. It published many games in BASIC and machine language, occasionally also printing assembly language source code. Ahoy! published a checksum program called Flankspeed for entering machine language listings.

Ahoy!'s AmigaUser was a related but separate publication dedicated to the Amiga. It was spun off from a series of columns in Ahoy! with the same title, and the first two issues were published instead of the parent magazine in May and August 1988.

References

External links

Gallery of covers and downloadable archive of disks

Monthly magazines published in the United States
Commodore 8-bit computer magazines
Defunct computer magazines published in the United States
Magazines established in 1984
Magazines disestablished in 1989
Magazines published in New York City
1984 establishments in New York City
1989 disestablishments in New York (state)